
This is a list of players who graduated from the Ben Hogan Tour in 1991. The top five players on the Ben Hogan Tour's money list in 1991 earned their PGA Tour card for 1992.

*PGA Tour rookie for 1992.

T = Tied
Green background indicates the player retained his PGA Tour card for 1993 (finished inside the top 125).
Yellow background indicates player did not retain his PGA Tour card for 1993, but retained conditional status (finished between 126–150).
Red background indicates the player did not retain his PGA Tour card for 1993 (finished outside the top 150).

Runners-up on the PGA Tour in 1992

See also
1991 PGA Tour Qualifying School graduates

References
Money list

Korn Ferry Tour
PGA Tour
Ben Hogan Tour Graduates
Ben Hogan Tour Graduates